Madea's Family Reunion is an 2002 American stage play written, directed and produced by Tyler Perry. It stars Tyler Perry as Madea, D'Atra Hicks as Jackie, David Mann as Mr. Brown, and Tamela Mann as Cora. The live performance released on VHS and DVD was recorded live in New Orleans at the Saenger Theatre in January 2002.

Synopsis
The Simmons family has a funeral, a wedding, and a family reunion all in the same weekend, and it is up to no-nonsense matriarch Madea to keep things in order.

Just as the southern matriarch Madea buries her younger sister, Irene, her granddaughter Lisa is marrying a successful, rich man named Ronnie at the house. But Lisa's fiancé is secretly beating her, and Lisa's ex-boyfriend and first love, A.J., Madea's mechanic, is going to do something about it. While Lisa is trying to cover up her bruises, her sister Tina is getting into more trouble: neglecting her baby, trying to seduce her cousin Jackie's husband Kevin, and stealing money for drugs from her mother, Cora. Madea's granddaughter Jackie and her ex-con unemployed husband Kevin live with Madea, and Jackie finds out she is pregnant and might have a miscarriage. When she goes to tell Kevin the news, she finds her cousin Tina trying to seduce him. Although she's upset with him, Jackie urges Kevin to get a job for the sake of their child. Meanwhile, Madea's know-it-all niece Victoria is being romantically pursued by her minister. Later, Tina and Lisa tearfully reveal to Cora that when they were kids, their father sexually abused them, and Cora reflects that it will take days of praying to get over this bombshell. Madea must endure the craziness of neighbor Leroy Brown and of the dysfunctional relatives all staying under her roof for the weekend. During the family reunion, Lisa tells everyone that Ronnie has been hitting her. On the wedding day, Lisa decides to marry her first love, A.J.

Shows

Cast
Tyler Perry as Madea
D'Atra Hicks as Jackie 
Tamela Mann as Cora 
David Mann as Mr. Brown
Isaac Caree as Reverend Johnny Lewis 
Quan Howell (filmed version)
Pebbles Johnson as Vickie 
Sonya Evans as Lisa  
Gary Jenkins as A.J. 
Zakiya Williams as Tina
Terry Phillips as Kevin
Mike Storm as Ronnie
Regina McCrary as Mattie 
James Tittle IV as Brian
Kim Easterling as Aquaneesha

The Band 

 Elvin Ross - Musical Director
 Mike Frazier - Bass
 Eric Morgan - Drums
 John Forbes - Keyboards
 Jim Gorst - Sound
 David Sears - Sound

Musical numbers
All songs written and/or produced by Tyler Perry and Elvin D. Ross.
"I Miss My Old Friend" – Cora
"Old Time Mix (consists of Jesus Will Fix It, On the Battlefield, Trouble in My Way, and Have You Tried Jesus?)" - Reverend Johnny, Mattie, Cora, and Brown
"It Ain't Over" – A.J.
"How Much Can One Heart Take?" – Jackie
"Open My Heart" – Vickie
"Marriage Can Be Love" – Reverend Johnny
"I Can Say I'm Sorry" – Kevin and Jackie
"A Family That Prays Together" – Company

Plays by Tyler Perry
2002 plays
American plays adapted into films
Southern United States in fiction
Plays set in the United States
African-American plays
Plays about families